Iceane is a saturated polycyclic hydrocarbon with formula C12H18. It has a cage-like molecular structure, whose carbon skeleton can be viewed as three fused cyclohexane rings in the boat conformation; or as two such rings in the chair conformation, connected by three parallel (axial) bonds. The spatial arrangement of carbon atoms in Iceane is the lonsdalite crystalline structure.

The name "iceane" was proposed by the chemist Louis Fieser about a decade before the compound was first prepared. He was carrying out studies on the arrangement of water molecules in ice, when it occurred to him that there could exist a stable hydrocarbon with the above structure.

It is also referred to as wurtzitane, due to its similarity to the wurtzite crystal structure; however, the name "iceane" has precedence.

See also
 Adamantane
 Twistane
 Propellane
 Hexanitrohexaazaisowurtzitane

References

External links
Royal Society of Chemistry Journal
Symmetry Through the Eyes of a Chemist, Magdolna Hargittai
 A Basis for Synthesis Design, Tse-Lok Ho
Structures and Energies of Polycyclic Hydrocarbons, Joan E. Shields

Polycyclic nonaromatic hydrocarbons